SLSA can refer to:
Surf Life Saving Australia, the peak surf lifesaving organisation in Australia
The Saint Lucia Scout Association, the national Scouting organization of Saint Lucia
State Library of South Australia
Special light-sport aircraft, an American category of factory-built two seat aircraft
 Society for Literature, Science, and the Arts